Wamberg is a Danish surname. Notable people with the surname include:

 Johan Bülow Wamberg (1786–1852), Norwegian politician
 Niels Wamberg (1920–2016), Danish coxswain
  (born 1888–1959), Danish journalist

Danish-language surnames